The 1903 Kendall Orange and Black football team represented Henry Kendall College—now known as the University of Tulsa—as an independent during the 1903 college football season. The team compiled a record of 3–3.

Schedule

References

Kendall
Tulsa Golden Hurricane football seasons
Kendall Orange and Black football